Colnbrook with Poyle is a civil parish in the borough of Slough in Berkshire, England. The local council is Colnbrook with Poyle Parish Council. The parish was created on 1 April 1995 as an amalgamation of Colnbrook from the parish of Iver with Poyle from an unparished area. At the 2001 census it had a population of 5,426.

History
The parish was formed on 1 April 1995.  Most of Colnbrook had been from 1974 in the parish of Iver in South Bucks district in Buckinghamshire, and before 1974 had been mostly in the parish of Horton, with small areas in Langley Marish. Poyle had been in the unparished borough of Spelthorne in Surrey (before 1974 forming part of the Staines Urban District of Surrey which had transferred from Middlesex in 1965).  The new parish became part of Berkshire, and was the last boundary change before Berkshire County Council was abolished in 1998 and replaced by several unitary authorities.

Geography
It is at the eastern end of the borough of Slough, and is just to the west of the M25 motorway, which separates the parish from Heathrow Airport in the London Borough of Hillingdon in Greater London.

References

External links

Colnbrook with Poyle Parish Council
The Berkshire, Buckinghamshire and Surrey (County Boundaries) Order 1994
Colnbrook Views - news and discussion portal for residents of Colnbrook with Poyle

Civil parishes in Berkshire
Slough